In population genetics, research has been done on the genetic origins of modern Japanese people.

Overview
From the point of view of genetic studies, Japanese people:
 descend from both the Yayoi people and the heterogeneous Jōmon population. 
 are genetically most similar to Ryukyuans, Ainu people and Koreans as well as other East Asian people.

Origins

A common origin of Japanese has been proposed by a number of scholars since Arai Hakuseki first brought up the theory and Fujii Sadamoto, a pioneer of modern archaeology in Japan, also treated the issue in 1781. But after the end of World War II, Kotondo Hasebe and Hisashi Suzuki claimed that the origin of Japanese people was not the newcomers in the Yayoi period (300 BCE – 300 CE) but the people in the Jōmon period. However, Kazuro Hanihara announced a new racial admixture theory in 1984. Hanihara also announced the theory "dual structure model" in English in 1991. According to Hanihara, modern Japanese lineages began with Jōmon people, who moved into the Japanese archipelago during Paleolithic. Hanihara believed that there was a second wave of immigrants, from northeast Asia to Japan from the Yayoi period. Following a population expansion in Neolithic times, these newcomers then found their way to the Japanese archipelago sometime during the Yayoi period. As a result, miscegenation was common in the island regions of Kyūshū, Shikoku, and Honshū, but did not prevail in the outlying islands of Okinawa and Hokkaidō, and the Ryukyuan and Ainu people continued to dominate there. Mark J. Hudson claimed that the main ethnic image of Japanese people was biologically and linguistically formed from 400 BCE to 1,200 CE. Currently, the most well-regarded theory is that present-day Japanese are descendants of both the indigenous Jōmon people and the immigrant Yayoi people.On the other hand, a study published in October 2009 by the National Museum of Nature and Science et al. concluded that the Minatogawa Man, who was found in Okinawa and was regarded as evidence that the Jōmon people were not a homogenous group and that these southern Jōmon came to Japan via a southern route and had a slender and more neo-Mongoloid face unlike the northern Jōmon. Hiroto Takamiya of the Sapporo University suggested that the people of Kyushu immigrated to Okinawa between the 10th and 12th centuries CE.

A 2011 study by Sean Lee and Toshikazu Hasegawa reported that a common origin of Japonic languages had originated around 2,182 years before present.

A study conducted in 2017 by Ulsan University in Korea presented evidence that the genetic origin of Koreans is closer to that of Southeast Asians (Vietnamese people). This was additionally supported by Japanese research conducted in 1999 that supported the theory that the origin of the Yayoi people was in southern China near the Yangtze river.

The origins of the Jōmon and Yayoi people have often been a subject of dispute, and a recent Japanese publisher has divided the potential routes of the people living on the Japanese archipelago as follows:

Aboriginals that have been living in Japan for more than 10,000 years. (Without geographic distinction, which means, the group of people living in islands from Hokkaido to Okinawa may all be considered to be Aboriginals in this case.)
Immigrants from the northern route (北方ルート in Japanese) including the people from the Korean Peninsula, Mainland China and Sakhalin Island.
Immigrants from the southern route (南方ルート in Japanese) including the people from the Pacific Islands, Southeast Asia, and in some context, India.
However, a clear consensus has not been reached.

A study in 2017 estimates the Jōmon ancestry in people from Tokyo at approximately 12%.

In 2018, an independent research conducted by director Kenichi Shinoda and his team at National Museum of Nature and Science was broadcast on NHK Science ZERO and it was discovered that the modern day Japanese are genetically extremely close to the modern day Koreans.

A genome study (Takahashi et al. 2019) shows that modern Japanese (Yamato) do not have much Jōmon ancestry at all. Nuclear genome analysis of Jōmon samples and modern Japanese samples show strong differences.
Various studies estimate the proportion of Jōmon ancestry in Japanese people at around 9-13%, with the remainder derived from later migrations from Asia including the Yayoi people.

A study, published in the Cambridge University Press in 2020, suggests that the Jōmon people were rather heterogeneous, and that there was also a pre-Yayoi migration during the Jōmon period, which may be linked to the arrival of the Japonic languages, meaning that Japonic is one of the Jōmon languages. This migration is suggested to have happened before 6000BC, thus before the actual Yayoi migration.

The most popular theory is that the Yayoi people were the people who brought wet rice cultivation to Japan from the Korean peninsula and Jiangnan near the Yangtze River Delta in ancient China. According to several Japanese historians, the Yayoi and their ancestors, the Wajin, originated in the today Yunnan province in southern China. Suwa Haruo considered Wa-zoku (Wajin) to be part of the Baiyue (百越).

Recent full genome analyses in 2020 by Boer et al. 2020 and Yang et al. 2020, reveals some further information regarding the origin of the Jōmon peoples. They were found to have largely formed from a Paleolithic Siberian population and an East Asian related population.

In 2021, a  research from a study published in the journal Science Advances conducted by a team of Japanese and Irish researchers at Trinity College Dublin found that the people of Japan bore genetic signatures from three ancient populations rather than just two as previously thought. The study found that up to 71% of the ancient Kofun people shared a common genetic strand with the Han Chinese while the rest shared with the Yayoi people and the Jōmon people.

In addition, The Nikkei published a new finding that showed that the Kofun strand of modern day Japanese concentrated in specific regions such as Kinki, Hokuriku and Shikoku.

According to a study on genetic distance measurements from a large scale genetic study from 2021 titled 'Genomic insights into the formation of human populations in East Asia', the modern "Japanese populations can be modelled as deriving from Korean (91%) and Jomon (9%)."

The aforementioned study is further supported by recent studies in 2022 which concluded that the ancient Jōmon people were present outside of Japan, but were later significantly diminished due to the influx of proto-Koreans originating from the West Liao River, arriving in both the Korean peninsula and Japanese archipelago.

Anthropometry
Stephen Pheasant (1986), who taught anatomy, biomechanics and ergonomics at the Royal Free Hospital and the University College, London, said that Far Eastern people have proportionately shorter lower limbs than European and black African people. Pheasant said that the proportionately short lower limbs of Far Eastern people is a difference that is most characterized in Japanese people, less characterized in Korean and Chinese people, and least characterized in Vietnamese and Thai people.

Rajvir Yadav et al. (2000) stated the sitting height to stature ratios of different populations: South Indian (0.4922), female Indian (0.4974), Eastern Indian (0.4991), Southeastern African (0.5096), Central Indian (0.5173), US (0.5202), Western Indian (0.5243), German (0.5266) and Japanese (0.5452).

Hirofumi Matsumura et al. (2001) and Hideo Matsumoto et al. (2009) said that the Japanese and Vietnamese people are regarded to be a mix of Northeast Asians and Southeast Asians. However, the amount of northern genetics is higher in Japanese people compared to Vietnamese, who are closer to other Southeast Asians (Thai or Bamar people).

Neville Moray (2005) said that, for Korean and Japanese pilots, sitting height is more than 54% of their stature, with about 46% of their stature from leg length. Moray said that, for Americans and most Europeans, sitting height is about 52% of their stature, with about 48% of their stature from leg length. Moray indicated that modifications in basic cockpit geometry are required to accommodate Japanese and Vietnamese pilots. Moray said that the Japanese have longer torsos and a higher shoulder point than the Vietnamese, but the Japanese have about similar arm lengths to the Vietnamese, so the control stick would have to be moved 8 cm closer to the pilot for the Japanese and 7 cm closer to the pilot for the Vietnamese. Moray said that, due to having shorter legs than Americans, rudder pedals must be moved closer to the pilot by 10 cm for the Japanese and 12 cm for the Vietnamese.

Craniometry
Ashley Montagu (1989) said that the "Mongoloid skull generally, whether Chinese or Japanese, has been rather more neotenized than the Caucasoid or European..."

Ann Kumar (1998) said that Michael Pietrusewsky (1992) said that, in a craniometric study, Borneo, Vietnam, Sulu, Java, and Sulawesi are closer to Japan, in that order, than Mongolian and Chinese populations are close to Japan. In the craniometric study, Michael Pietrusewsky (1992) said that, even though Japanese people cluster with Mongolians, Chinese and Southeast Asians in a larger Asian cluster, Japanese people are more closely aligned with several mainland and island Southeast Asian samples than with Mongolians and Chinese.

In a craniometric study, Pietrusewsky (1994) found that the Japanese series, which was a series that spanned from the Yayoi period to modern times, formed a single branch with Korea. Later, Pietrusewsky (1999) found, however, that Korean and Yayoi people were very highly separated in the East Asian cluster, indicating that the connection that Japanese have with Korea would not have derived from Yayoi people.

Park Dae-kyoon et al. (2001) said that distance analysis based on thirty-nine non-metric cranial traits showed that Koreans are closer craniometrically to Kazakhs and Mongols than to the populations in China and Japan.

See also 
Demographics of Japan
Genetic studies on Japanese Americans
History of Japan
Japanese people

References

Japan
Modern human genetic history
Genetic genealogy
Japanese